The 2019–20 season was Yeni Malatyaspor's 34th year in existence. In addition to the domestic league, Yeni Malatyaspor participated in the Turkish Cup.

Squad

Süper Lig

League table

Results summary

Results by round

Matches

UEFA Europa League

Second qualifying round

Third qualifying round

References
 

Yeni Malatyaspor seasons
Turkish football clubs 2019–20 season